Pryteria hamifera is a moth in the family Erebidae. It was described by Paul Dognin in 1907. It is found in French Guiana, Guyana and Bolivia.

References

Moths described in 1907
Phaegopterina